Kamino bodies are eosinophilic globoids. Kamino bodies are commonly observed microscopically with the condition spitz nevi,  a benign melanocytic nevus, a type of skin lesion, affecting the epidermis and dermis.

See also
 List of cutaneous conditions

References

Dermatologic terminology